Guanomyces is a genus of fungi within the family, Chaetomiaceae. This is a monotypic genus, containing the single species Guanomyces polythrix.

References

External links
Guanomyces at Index Fungorum

Sordariales
Monotypic Sordariomycetes genera